Dorothy Sara Blair, nee Greene (1913-1998) was an English scholar and translator of Francophone African literature.

Life
Marjorie Greene was born in Birmingham. She studied at Royal Holloway College before training to teach French at Cambridge. In 1939 she married Maurice Blair, and moved to South Africa. She was a university lecturer at the University of Cape Town before becoming professor of romance languages at the University of the Witwatersrand. On retirement she returned to England, living in Brighton and carrying out freelance literary translation from French.

Her papers are held at the University of Westminster.

Works
 Jules Supervielle, a modern fabulist. 1957.
 African literature in French: a history of creative writing in French from west and equatorial Africa. 1976
 (tr.) Snares without end by Olympe Bhêly-Quénum. 1981.
 (tr.) The beggars' strike, or, The dregs of society by Aminata Sow Fall. 1981.
 Senegalese literature: a critical history. 1984.
 (tr.) Fantasia, an Algerian cavalcade by Assia Djebar. 1985.
 (tr.) Scarlet song by Mariama Bâ. 1986.
 (tr.) My life story: the autobiography of a Berber woman by Fadhma A. M Amrouche. 1988.
 (tr.) The first century after Beatrice by Amin Maalouf. 1992.
 (tr.) Africa dances by Michael Huet and Claude Savary. 1995.
 (tr.) The gardens of light : a novel by Amin Maalouf. 1996.
 (tr.) The battle of Kadesh by Christian Jacq. 1998.
 (tr.) Sherazade'' by Leïla Sebbar. 1999.

References

1913 births
1998 deaths
Scholars of African literature
Scholars of French literature
English translators
French–English translators
English Africanists
People from Birmingham, West Midlands
Alumni of Royal Holloway, University of London
Academic staff of the University of Cape Town
Academic staff of the University of the Witwatersrand
20th-century British translators